Jason Demetriou (born 18 November 1987) is a Cypriot international footballer who plays as a defender for Southend United. In October 2021, Demetriou also took temporary charge of the Southend first team as interim head coach.

Career

Leyton Orient
Demetriou came through the youth ranks at English club Leyton Orient and signed his first full professional contract with the team in July 2006. He made his league debut in November 2006 when he came off the bench in a 0–0 draw with Yeovil Town. He went on to make 24 appearances in his first year, in both league and cup competitions, mostly as a substitute.

The 2007–08 season was a breakthrough season winning the young talent award for Leyton Orient. Demetriou himself has given much credit to ex-manager Martin Ling for giving him the chance to prove himself at this level of football particularly in the 2007–08 season.

Despite Leyton Orient struggling throughout the 2008–09 season, Demetriou's performances impressed the fans and he was linked with big money moves away to Premiership and Championship clubs Plymouth Argyle and Charlton Athletic. The Orient play-maker publicly stated his intent to stay at Brisbane Road and, at the end of the season, was awarded the Fans' Player of the Year award.

AEK Larnaca
Demetriou officially signed for AEK Larnaca on 2 June 2010, for an undisclosed fee, to be able to progress as an international for Cyprus. He said he was very sad to leave Leyton Orient but had to move in order to play international football.

Anorthosis Famagusta
On 28 June 2013, Demetriou signed a 2+1 year contract with Anorthosis Famagusta F.C.

Walsall

On 1 July 2015, it was confirmed that Demetriou had signed a contract for Walsall for an undisclosed fee, pending International Clearance.

Southend United
On 22 June 2016, it was announced Demetriou had signed for Southend United, subject to a medical being completed. Demetriou had turned down a new deal at Walsall and also the chance to move to Portsmouth. In October 2021, Demetriou took charge of the first team as interim head coach following the sacking of Phil Brown as manager, winning his only game in charge, a 4–1 win over Chertsey Town in the FA Cup Fourth Qualifying Round on 16 October 2021.

International career
On 20 January 2009, he was called up to Cyprus squad for the first time by manager Angelos Anastasiadis, qualifying thanks to his Greek Cypriot paternal roots. He made his debut against Serbia in the 2–0 home defeat coming on as a sub for Demetris Christofi on 10 February. On 11 February Demetriou made his second appearance and full debut against Slovakia, where he assisted two goals in a 3–2 win for Cyprus. He was awarded man of the match award for his performance in this match. On 10 October 2015, he scored his first international goal, netting the winner in the 1–2 away win for Cyprus against Israel in the Euro 2016 qualification stage, which allowed Wales to qualify for Euro 2016 despite losing to Bosnia & Herzagovnia. Demetriou retired from international football in 2020.

Career statistics

Club

International

International goals
As of match played 16 November 2019. Cyprus score listed first, score column indicates score after each Demetriou goal.

References

External links
 
  (profile 1)
  (profile 2)
 

1987 births
Living people
English footballers
Cypriot footballers
Cyprus international footballers
Cypriot expatriates in England
Leyton Orient F.C. players
AEK Larnaca FC players
Walsall F.C. players
Southend United F.C. players
English people of Greek Cypriot descent
Anorthosis Famagusta F.C. players
English Football League players
Association football defenders
Association football coaches
People from the London Borough of Newham